Makoni District is a district in Zimbabwe.

Location
The district is located in Manicaland Province, in northeastern Zimbabwe.

Economy
Makoni District is primarily a farming district. The chief cash crop is tobacco.

Population
In 2002, the national census estimated the population of Makoni District at 151,596 people. In 2004, the district population was estimated at 272,578. In 2011, the population of the district was estimated at 283,017. The next national population census in Zimbabwe is scheduled from 18 August 2012 through 28 August 2012.

See also
 Districts of Zimbabwe
 Provinces of Zimbabwe

References

External links

 
Districts of Manicaland Province